Hasan Fakri is a Bangladeshi film lyricist and poet. He won Bangladesh National Film Award for Best Lyrics for the film Banglar Bodhu (1993). He edits a magazine called Parjas. He is the co-president of the cultural organization Ganamukti's music troop.

Notable work

Filmography
 Banglar Bodhu

Poems
 Mutho Mutho Kanna (Tears of full Fists)- 1970
 Hasan Fakrir Kabita o Gaan (Poetry and songs of Hasan Fakri) - 2002

Drama
 Bachte Chai (Want to Live)-  1972
 Ek Khando Bangladesh (A Part of Bangladesh)- 1972 
 Appointment Letter - 1975
 Crash Farakka - 1976
 Rakkhosh Sabdhan (Monsters, be careful)- 1977
 Sareng Lanch Ghorao (Sareng, Turn around the Launch)- 1980
 Tanor Ekhon Sara Desh, (Now Tanore is the Whole Country)- 1980
 Jadi Emon Hoto (If that were the case)- 1982 
 Khor Bayu Boy (Blowing Stormy Air)- 1983
 Voter Vat (Vat of Vote)- 1986

Awards and nominations
National Film Awards

References

External links

1952 births
Living people
Bangladeshi lyricists
Best Lyricist National Film Award (Bangladesh) winners
People from Munshiganj District
Anti-revisionists
Bangladeshi communists
Bangladeshi Marxists
Bangladeshi political writers